Malin Burnham (born November 12, 1927, in San Diego, California) is an American sailor, real estate developer and philanthropist.

Sailing 
At the age of 17, he won the Star World Championships in 1944 (crewing for Gerald Driscoll) and won it again in 1945 (together with Lowell North). He was involved in Dennis Conner's 1987 and 1988 Stars & Stripes America's Cup campaigns and was named to the America's Cup Hall of Fame in 2002. Burnham was inducted into the National Sailing Hall of Fame in 2016. In 2022 the position of assistant sailing coach at Stanford was endowed as the Malin Burnham Assistant Sailing Coach.

Career 
Burnham has a bachelor's degree in Industrial Engineering from Stanford University. He has been an active real estate developer in the San Diego area since the 1940s; his family owns real estate brokerage firm, Burnham Real Estate Services, was founded in 1891 and was acquired by Cushman & Wakefield in 2008.

Philanthropy 
He is also known for his extensive charitable activities in San Diego.  The Sanford Burnham Prebys Medical Discovery Institute is partially named in his honor for his gift in 1996.

Beginning in 2014 he led a group of San Diegans seeking to acquire the U-T San Diego newspaper from Doug Manchester and run it as a nonprofit entity.

He is a board member to Katerva, called by Reuters as the Nobel Prize for Sustainability.

References

External links
Malin Burnham executive profile, Bloomberg Business

American male sailors (sport)
Star class sailors
People from San Diego
Philanthropists from California
American real estate businesspeople
Living people
1927 births
1987 America's Cup sailors
1988 America's Cup sailors
1977 America's Cup sailors
Star class world champions
World champions in sailing for the United States